Forsyth Island lies in the outer Marlborough Sounds of New Zealand's South Island and is separated from the mainland by the 300m wide Allen Strait (also known as Guards Pass).

As of 2012, it is one of the largest entirely privately owned islands in the South Pacific, and offers exclusive accommodation, accessible via helicopter and boat.

Forsyth Island is connected to electricity and phone via a cable across Allen Strait and is serviced weekly by a mail boat from Havelock.

See also 
 List of islands of New Zealand

Sources

National Geographic
Article
Brochure
News report

External links 

Official website

Islands of the Marlborough Sounds
Private islands of New Zealand
Populated places in the Marlborough Sounds